Rip Hunter is a time-traveling superhero appearing in American comic books published by DC Comics. Created by writer Jack Miller and artist Ruben Moreira, the character first appeared in Showcase #20 (May 1959). Following three more appearances in Showcase (#21, 25, 26), Rip Hunter was given his own series which ran for 29 issues (1961–65). He later starred in the eight-issue Time Masters series (1990), written by Bob Wayne and Lewis Shiner. After numerous revisions and following the events of the 2005 "Infinite Crisis" storyline, Hunter is established as the son of Booster Gold.

The character, portrayed by Arthur Darvill, appeared in the first three and seventh seasons of The CW's Arrowverse television series Legends of Tomorrow.

Publication history

The Challengers of the Unknown is a quartet of science fiction adventurers created by Jack Kirby. They debuted in 1957, and their commercial success spawned two other science fiction characters: Cave Carson and Rip Hunter. Hunter was the more successful of the two, with art in his early appearances by Joe Kubert, Mike Sekowsky, and Nick Cardy. Hunter was the leader of a gang of time travelers who were featured in brisk and historically accurate adventures in various eras. DC editor Jack Schiff reported that he and writer Jack Miller had "lots of fun" creating the comics.

Rip Hunter has had a number of revisions within the fictional DC Universe. Those changes are generally connected to larger events and story lines. The writing and editorial staff often use a narrative device within the comics, known as a crisis event, to explain dramatic changes to the appearance or personality of characters. Rip Hunter has undergone a number of different developments within this fictional universe.

Fictional character biography

In his original incarnation, Rip Hunter is portrayed as an ordinary man who uses his invention, the Time Sphere, to travel through time. Aided by his friend Jeff Smith, girlfriend Bonnie Baxter, and Bonnie's kid brother Corky, they have adventures in time. These stories were told in the series Rip Hunter...Time Master which ran for 29 issues between 1961 and 1965.

Rip is next seen in the series Challengers of the Unknown, where, in the year AD 12,000,000, he assists the Challengers of the Unknown, Swamp Thing, and Deadman in defeating the dictatorial Sun Lords. The character's next major appearance is in Action Comics #552–554. With the aid of Superman and the team known as the Forgotten Heroes, an alien invasion of Earth is prevented.

The Forgotten Heroes are then seen in the 1985 series Crisis on Infinite Earths, a mini-series intended to change the fictional universe shared by DC characters. During this story, Hunter serves as a plot device to enable the superheroes of the Multiverse to travel to the dawn of time where they face off against the Anti-Monitor. The battle that ensues effectively destroys the Multiverse. Hunter then reunites with some of his Forgotten Heroes teammates, as well as cosmic heroes Adam Strange and Captain Comet in a quest to defeat the Anti-Monitor once and for all. With the help of Brainiac, they journey to Apokolips, where the tyrant Darkseid uses his advanced science to peer into the Anti-Matter universe and aid Alex Luthor, Superman, and Superboy-Prime in the ultimate destruction of the Anti-Monitor. This narrative event allowed the writing staff of DC Comics to alter many of their heroes and fictional situations.

The Crisis on Infinite Earths series was used as a plot device to dramatically alter the fictional histories of many characters. Unlike most other characters, Hunter continues with the same personality and memories that preceded this event. This event was used as a literary device to portray him as a man out of time and without a home. No one remembers that he existed. The writers further expanded on this by having their new fictional universe contain an alternative version of Rip, one who was native to this timeline, and also a master of time travel.

The original version of Rip is then depicted as attracting the attention of the Linear Men with his attempts to reach his original universe. Impressed by Hunter, the Linear Men recruit him into their ranks and the writers altered the appearance of Rip, using the stress of time travel as an explanation for those changes. Now, with white hair and bionic implants, he is seen in a number of series that involve time, or the manipulation of time as an element of the narrative—most notably during the Zero Hour mini-series and event.

In The Kingdom, Hunter turns on the other Linear Men, who believe that time follows a single course of events, and joins forces with Superman, Batman, and Wonder Woman. Rip also joins forces with young heroes from the future, to stop the time-traveling villain Gog in his efforts to destroy Kansas twenty years ahead of schedule. As a result of this battle, Hunter finally breaks down the barrier to Hypertime, revealing that the Linear Men are wrong about the non-existence of alternate timelines in the post-Crisis universe. Rip also reveals that the timeline of the Kingdom can exist, regardless of what happens in the present.

Shortly thereafter, the Linear Men, including the original character of Hunter, are destroyed during the Imperiex onslaught. Although their consciousnesses survive, and they eventually construct new bodies for themselves, they have been driven insane by the experience. The Quintessence, a group of cosmic beings who counsel one another, disband the Linear Men, and Hunter vanishes in a whirlwind.

Running parallel to those stories, another version of Rip has adventures; as the inventor of time travel technology in the Post-Crisis universe. In this universe, Hunter aids heroes Booster Gold and Animal Man in their own time-traveling adventures, before taking on the vast Illuminati conspiracy during the eight issue series Time Masters. This more gritty and realistic (symbolized by jeans and a T-shirt rather than a costume) take on the character attempts to change the past to prevent the Illuminati, led by Vandal Savage, from coming into existence. During the series, a relative of the character known as Dan Hunter decides to stay in the past at the time of the Revolutionary War. This is used to create a link between Rip Hunter and the pre-existing western themed Dan Hunter, a character associated with Tomahawk. This series concludes with Hunter being stranded in the prehistoric past.

In the Chronos series, starring Walker Gabriel, an alternate version of Gabriel, experimenting with time travel to avert World War III, mentions a horrible accident suffered by a Commander Hunter, who apparently scattered himself across time, with only "bits of flesh and bone" which kept resynchronizing in the lab.

Rip's next major appearance is within the page of 2004's Justice Society of America, where he takes members of the modern day Justice Society of America back in time to fight the villainous Per Degaton. Once again, Rip serves as a device that allows for time-travel, and for other heroes to travel forwards and backwards in time. This version of the character returns to a sci-fi influenced costume and the use of a time bubble. The ramifications of being a time-traveler are explored by the writer Geoff Johns, who turns the name Rip Hunter into an alias. This is explained as being part of an attempt by the character to hide all of the details of his history, lest an enemy travel back in time and kill him as a child.

52
The themes of time and changes to the timeline are next explored in the weekly series 52. Following up from events in the Infinite Crisis mini-series, Booster Gold tries to contact Hunter. Booster discovers his base of operations in a time-locked concrete bunker in the Arizona desert, but when he finally manages to enter the bunker, he finds only a blackboard, a globe, and some pieces of paper filled with writings about the future. These papers had references to facts and events like the mortality of Vandal Savage, the last Lazarus Pit of Nyssa Raatko, and the appearances of the mysterious Supernova. The purpose of the blackboard was to provide clues for the readers of upcoming storylines within that series and other DC Universe titles.

As this series progresses, more and more time-traveling characters, such as Waverider are killed by a mysterious figure who is later revealed to be Skeets.

Hunter finally emerges in the Bottle City of Kandor. Working with Supernova, Hunter has been trying to put together a machine that will "fix" time before Skeets can find him. When Skeets attacks Kandor, Supernova turns back into Booster Gold and battles Skeets using special items gathered from the planet. Rip Hunter and Booster then teleport away, angering Skeets even more. Upon discovering Mr. Mind burrowing into Skeets' shell, Rip Hunter uses T.O. Morrow and the severed head of Red Tornado as bait for the Venusian worm. Mr. Mind metamorphoses into a nigh-omnipotent imago form, a hyperfly feeding on universes. Hunter then reveals to Booster Gold and Booster's ancestor Daniel Carter that the Multiverse is restored as 52 individual universes as a result of Alex Luthor's actions after he escaped his "paradise dimension". Mr. Mind seeks to devour every parallel universe. Sealing Mr. Mind in a time-rift, the multiverse is saved. Hunter warns the others to keep the Multiverse a secret for the time being as he eagerly prepares to explore it.

Booster Gold
Rip is next seen as an integral part of the cast of the Booster Gold series. Rip acts as a companion and boss to Booster Gold. His identity is revealed to be that of Booster Gold's yet-to-be-born son and that most, if not all, of Rip's exploits were actually committed by Booster.

To protect the timeline, Rip convinces Booster to turn down membership in the recently reformed Justice League and to continue to act like a self-absorbed goof to make sure that his father's legacy is one of failure and is ultimately forgotten by history. This is done to ensure rogue time travelers have no motivation to kill Booster in the past, erasing Rip in the process and the various works he and Booster will engage in to protect the timestream. Rip and an older Booster occasionally would interact during the present version's mission, as they discuss the need to manipulate Booster (in particular, teaching him not to change history when Booster demands they prevent the death of Ted Kord).

In Carl Draper's Checkmate blog, a reference is made to the Smith-Baxter Group, a time-travel consultancy whose founders were trained by Hunter.

In this new version, Rip Hunters' methods are darker than previously portrayed: he imprisoned the surviving members of the Linear Men after they tried to mess with the timeline to save Waverider (the time abnormality); and Rip tortured Rex Hunter when Rex wouldn't give Rip information. Rip might have also been motivated by a personal grudge, as Rex was a former Time Master who had murdered Rips' previous team. Rex had been working with the Time Stealers and was murdered as a child by them before Rip could learn any information.

Time Masters: Vanishing Point
Rip, along with Booster Gold, Superman, and Hal Jordan starred in Time Masters: Vanishing Point (2010–11), a limited series that is a companion piece to Batman: The Return of Bruce Wayne. The series followed the heroes' journey to find Batman who was lost in time following Final Crisis.

"Convergence"
Though Rip Hunter was shown blinking out of existence following the end of the 2011 storyline "Flashpoint", it is revealed  in the 2015 storyline "Convergence", that he survived and may have turned against his own father, Booster Gold (who survived the continuity reboot of the DC Universe that occurred in the aftermath of "Flashpoint" with The New 52). Through means which are yet to be revealed, Rip Hunter almost managed to prevent his father from frantically warning his newly created counterpart that the romance between Wonder Woman and Superman will erase the past of his future from existence.

Vertigo
A Rip Hunter story by writer Damon Lindelof and artist Jeff Lemire appeared in Time Warp #1 published by Vertigo in May 2013.

DC Rebirth
During DC Rebirth the Green Lantern Corps began investigating strange temporal anomalies, one such anomaly was detected inside the Citadel of the Corps. As the Green Lanterns stay on guard, from the anomaly emerges Rip Hunter who introduces himself and delivers a cryptic message before he passes out: "The Green Lantern Corps has been erased from the future...". More strange is when Hal Jordan notices that Hunter is wearing a Green Lantern power ring. Rip Hunter was seen in the DC Nuclear Winter Special #1, stranded on a post-apocalyptic version of Earth's future telling holiday stories about DC heroes from alternate earths, the future, and the past to some cannibals trying to eat him, stalling for time while he recharged the battery in his Time Sphere.

Later, when Booster Gold and Blue Beetle attempted to establish a “Heroes for Hire” type business, subsidized by Beetle’s fortune which fell through, thanks to Beetle being shut out of his own company. Booster Gold and Blue Beetle’s troubles were compounded by the arrival of the Omnizon, an alien warrior claiming Earth as her own. Help has arrived, however, in the form of Rip Hunter. After investigating, Hunter learns that Omnizon and her people claimed the Earth millennia ago, when humanity was still in its infancy and in no position to dispute the claim. Hunter tells his companion Terri that he can help, but it will require “breaking the rules”. Terri, curious, presses Rip about time-travel, and she realizes he can find out anything he wants from any point in time with Terry concluding that this level of power is too dangerous to be in one person’s hands. Rip agrees, telling her this is why he leads a guarded life, constantly protecting his identity. When Hunter confronts Omnizon and her people, he reminds her that to kill a Time Master like himself is to bring about her own destruction. Rip Hunter does not elaborate what he meant by this, but the implication is clear: Rip Hunter’s knowledge of the time stream and temporal mechanics makes him dangerous beyond measure - more so than any member of the Justice League. Rip Hunter was about to leave by boom tube after he had saved his father and his best friend from a battle. Rip Hunter friend Trixie wanted to say good to him, and was wondering why Rip Hunter cared for Booster Gold for. Rip Hunter reveled to his friend Trixie that Booster Gold was his dad, and that he did not want to embarrassed her about with a long story about time-travel. Rip Hunter went into the boom tube, and he left to do some work and do some time-travel vacation.

In other media

 Rip Hunter appears in Batman: The Brave and the Bold, voiced by Brian Bloom. In the episode "Time Out for Vengeance!", he helps Batman and the Justice League International travel in time to save other versions of Batman from the minions of Equinox.
 Rip Hunter is mentioned in The Flash by Eobard Thawne as the original creator of the 'time sphere' the latter attempts to create as a means of returning to his own time. He indicates a personal knowledge of Hunter, somewhat icily referring to him as an “interesting man”. 
 Arthur Darvill portrays Rip Hunter in the CW's spin-off of Arrow and The Flash titled Legends of Tomorrow as a protagonist. In the first season, he is a rogue Time Master who has come to the present to assemble a team of heroes and villains (consisting of Ray Palmer, Sara Lance, Martin Stein, Jefferson Jackson, Carter Hall, Kendra Saunders, Leonard Snart and Mick Rory) to oppose the powerful immortal Vandal Savage. In the second season, Rip is temporarily brainwashed into becoming part of the villainous Legion of Doom. In the third season, he has formed the Time Bureau organization to fix time anachronisms and defeat the time entity Mallus. He sacrifices himself in the season finale to save his teammates.

References

External links
 
 Rip Hunter, Time Master at Don Markstein's Toonopedia. Archived from the original on January 14, 2017.
 Rip Hunter, Time Master Biography
 Rip's pre-Crisis Index
 Rip Hunter, Time Master sales figures for 1961-1965 at The Comics Chronicles

DC Comics martial artists
Fictional inventors
DC Comics titles
DC Comics superheroes
Comics characters introduced in 1959
Comics about time travel
Time travelers